Walter Douglas Boyd, M.D. is a notable Canadian cardiothoracic surgeon.

born in Ottawa, he is a graduate of Carleton University, and the University of Ottawa for his medical degree. In 1999, he Boyd completed the world's first closed-chest, beating-heart coronary artery bypass surgery with the use of the ZEUS Robotic Surgical System, and has conducted pioneering work in cardiothoracic surgery and the use of robotic surgical systems. Dr. Boyd is also recognized for performing the first human extracellular matrix xenograft implant for cardiovascular repair in March 2006.

He was the head of the Department of Cardiothoracic Surgery at the Cleveland Clinic in Florida from 2002 to 2009. In August, 2009 he was named Professor of Surgery, and Director of Robotics and Biosurgery at the University of California, Davis.

Current areas of research include pioneering work in cardiac tissue regeneration with extracellular matrix/stem cells, and remote presence surgery including the development of remote telerobotic surgery systems with supervised autonomy.

He has a wife, Lee and two children.

References

Carleton University alumni
University of Ottawa alumni
Living people
Year of birth missing (living people)
Canadian cardiac surgeons
University of California, Davis faculty